E 012 is a European B class road in Kazakhstan, connecting the cities of Almaty - Kokpek - Chundzha - Koktal and Khorgas to the border of China.

Route 

Almaty
Kokpek
Chundzha
Koktal
Khorgas

It connects to E40, E125, E011, E013, China National Highway 312 and G30 Lianyungang–Khorgas Expressway.

External links 
 UN Economic Commission for Europe: Overall Map of E-road Network (2007)

International E-road network
European routes in Kazakhstan